The Chiayi Municipal Museum is a museum in East District, Chiayi City, Taiwan.

History
The founding of the museum was a collective community effort in the hope to establish a cultural public space for all of the residents of Chiayi City. Among its displays are silk wrappings used to cover Tibetan Buddhist texts and an Islamic jade collection of the Qing emperors.

Exhibitions
The museum has the following galleries:

 Geological Hall
 Fossil Hall
 Fine Arts Gallery

Activities
The museum offers courses and workshops in calligraphy, brush ink painting, paper mache, illustration, ikebana with a Taiwanese touch etc.

Transportation
The museum is accessible within walking distance west from Beimen Station of the Alishan Forest Railway.

See also
 List of museums in Taiwan

References

External links

  

2004 establishments in Taiwan
City museums
East District, Chiayi
Museums established in 2004
Local museums in Taiwan
Natural history museums in Taiwan
Fossil museums
Geology museums
Museums in Chiayi